The National Home Energy Rating Scheme (NHER) is both a UK accreditation scheme for energy assessors and a rating scale for the energy efficiency of housing.

The NHER was owned and operated by National Energy Services (NES). Until 2011, NES was a trading subsidiary of the National Energy Foundation, an independent charity set up in 1988 to promote energy conservation and renewable energy, which launched the NHER scheme in 1991. In September 2016, NES transferred ownership of the NHER Scheme to Elmhurst Energy another independent accreditation scheme.

The NHER runs an accreditation scheme for energy assessors to produce the following:
Energy Performance Certificates for existing dwellings, using RDSAP
Energy Performance Certificates for new build dwellings, using SAP
Energy Performance Certificates for non-domestic buildings dwellings, using SBEM
Display Energy Certificates for public buildings, using DECs

The NHER scale for new build dwellings runs from 0 to 20, with 20 being best. It uses different criteria than the Standard Assessment Procedure (SAP) rating. The NHER rating takes into account the local environment and the effect it has on the building's energy rating. The NHER calculates the costs of space and water heating, but adds cooking, lights and appliances to give a comprehensive picture of energy usage in the home.

An average dwelling in England would currently score between 4.5 and 5.5 on the NHER scale. A gas-heated masonry semi meeting current United Kingdom Part L1 Building Regulations would score approximately NHER 10. A dwelling with an NHER rating of 20 achieves zero CO2 emissions along with zero net running costs.

See also

References

Housing in the United Kingdom
Low-energy building in the United Kingdom
Energy conservation in the United Kingdom
Building energy rating